A Very English Murder is a 1974 Soviet teleplay directed by Samson Samsonov, based on the 1951 novel An English Murder by Cyril Hare.

Plot

The film begins as relatives and friends come to Lord Warbeck's family castle for Christmas. Suddenly, during dinner, Robert Warbeck, the only son and heir of the old Lord, dies in front of the guests. Then Lord Warbeck himself dies. And then — one of the ladies guests in the house… Because of snow drifts police can not reach the house; the only police present is the Minister's guard, and not an investigator. Foreigner doctor Bottwink — a historian, invited by Lord Warbeck to work in his old library — is the only one who is able to understand what had happened. However, the investigation is complicated by the fact that almost all those present are connected with each other by strange, unpleasant and sometimes unexpected relationships.

Changes from the novel 
Overall, the film closely follows the novel. The introduction is compressed. The excursion undertaken by Sir Julius to a nearby village (Chapter XIV in the novel) has been removed.

Noticeable changes were made to soften the political conflict depicted in the novel.

 In the novel, Doctor Wenceslaus Bottwink, Ph.D., professor of history, is said to be born in Hungary, having Jewish and Russian blood. Fortunate to escape a Nazi concentration camp, he found himself on the shores of Great Britain. In the film, neither the first name nor ethnicity of Doctor Bottwink is revealed, although he is mentioned as a citizen of Austria, then Czechoslovakia, then Germany as the Second World War progressed.
 In the novel, the League of Liberty and Justice, organized by Robert Warbeck, is a fascist organization. In the film the League is described only as extremist.
 In the novel, Warbeck is clearly antisemitic. Unable to contain his political leanings even when talking to Lady Camilla, he bursts, "Has your new Jew friend asked you to go back to Palestine with him yet?" In the film this dialogue has been removed, although the nationalistic character of Robert's organization is established.
 In the novel, Sergeant Rogers asks Bottwink whether the Doctor was in Vienna during Dolfuss régime, and Bottwink clarifies that he was anti-Dolfuss, anti-clerical, and anti-Fascist. This dialog is removed from the film.
 In the novel, Sir Julius identifies himself as socialist. When thinking back about the murders that occurred in Warbeck Hall, he comes to a conclusion that it was him who was targeted, and he was spared only by chance. "Who are the real enemies of communism today? Why, we are — the democratic socialists of Western Europe!" exclaims Sir Julius, blaming Doctor Bottwink in the murders. This exchange is removed from the film, and Sir Julius is never called a socialist.
 Like the novel, the film reveals that Doctor Bottwink is a communist sympathizer, but omits to mention his anti-Stalinist stance.
 In the novel, Sir Julius and Mrs. Carstairs argue about the looting of the Winter Palace at Beijing and the suppression of the Boxer revolt by Eight-Nation Alliance. This argument is removed from the film.

Cast 

 Aleksey Batalov as Doctor Bottwink
 Leonid Obolensky as old Lord Thomas Warbeck (voiced by Andrei Fajt)
 Georgy Taratorkin as Robert Warbeck
 Boris Ivanov as Sir Julius Warbeck
 Ivan Pereverzev as Briggs (voiced by Yevgeny Vesnik)
 Irina Muravyova as Susan (voiced by Alla Budnitskaya)
 Faime Jürno as Lady Camilla Prendergast (voiced by Irina Kartashyova)
 Eugenija Pleškytė as Mrs. Carstairs
 Einari Koppel as sergeant Rogers

References

External links

1974 films
1974 crime drama films
Mosfilm films
Films directed by Samson Samsonov
Films based on British novels
Films scored by Eduard Artemyev
Soviet crime drama films